West Side Story (Original Broadway Cast) is the 1957 recording of a Broadway production of the musical West Side Story. Recorded 3 days after the show opened at the Winter Garden Theatre, the recording was released in October 1957 in both mono and stereo formats. In 1962, the album reached #5 on Billboard's Pop Album chart. It certified gold by the RIAA on January 12, 1962. The album was reissued in 1973 and made its first appearance on CD in 1986. A 1997 remastered edition is coupled with an orchestral suite named “Symphonic Dances from West Side Story” recomposed and conducted by its original composer Leonard Bernstein and performed by the New York Philharmonic recorded at the Manhattan Center on March 6, 1961.

It was recorded at the CBS 30th Street Studio in New York City.

Track listing 
All tracks written by Leonard Bernstein and Stephen Sondheim.

"Prologue" – 3:50
"Jet Song" – 2:10
"Something's Coming" – 2:40
"The Dance at the Gym" – 3:06
"Maria" – 2:40
"Tonight" – 3:53
"America" – 4:35
"Cool" – 4:01
"One Hand, One Heart" – 3:03
"Tonight (Quintet and Chorus)" – 3:40
"The Rumble" – 2:45
"I Feel Pretty" – 2:50
"Somewhere (Ballet)" – 7:35
"Gee, Officer Krupke" – 4:05
"A Boy Like That/I Have a Love" – 4:18
"Finale" – 2:02

Bonus tracks : Symphonic Dances from West Side Story 
"Prologue (Allegro Moderato)" – 4:07
"Somewhere (Adagio)" – 3:51
"Scherzo (Vivace E Leggiero)" – 1:17
"Mambo (Meno Presto)" – 2:14
"Cha-Cha (Andantino con Grazia)" – :53
"Meeting Scene (Meno Mosso)" – :47
"Cool Fugue (Allegretto)" – 3:03
"Rumble (Molto Allegro)" – 1:52
"Finale (Adagio)" – 2:47

Personnel

Performance

 Reri Grist – cast (Consuelo of The Sharks) - lead vocals (Track 13), background vocals (12)
 Leonard Bernstein Orchestra – orchestration
 Hank Brunjes – cast (Diesel of The Jets), background vocals (Tracks 2, 8, 10, 14)
 Michael Callan – cast (Riff, leader of The Jets), lead vocals (Tracks 2, 8, 10)
 Erne Castaldo – cast (Toro of The Sharks), background vocals (Track 10)
 Martin Charnin – cast (Big Deal of The Jets), background vocals (Tracks 2, 8, 10, 14)
 Wilma Curley – cast (Graziella of The Jets), background vocals (Tracks 2, 8, 10, 14)
 Grover Dale – cast (Snowboy of The Jets), lead vocals (Track 14)
 Carole d'Andrea – cast (Velma of The Jets), background vocals (Tracks 2, 8, 10, 14)
 Al de Sio – cast (Luis of The Sharks), background vocals  (Track 10)
 Marilyn d'Honau – cast (Clarice of The Jets), background vocals (Tracks 2, 8, 10, 14)
 Gene Gavin – cast (Anxious of The Sharks), background vocals (Track 10)
 Frank Green – cast (Mouthpiece of The Jets), background vocals (Tracks 2, 8, 10, 14)
 Lowell Harris – cast (Tiger of The Jets), background vocals (Tracks 2, 8, 10, 14)
 Larry Kert – cast (Tony), lead vocals (Tracks 3, 5-6, 9-10, 13)
 Irwin Kostal Orchestra – orchestration
 Carol Lawrence – cast (Maria), lead vocals (Tracks 6, 9-10, 12-13, 15)
 Ronnie Lee – cast (Nibbles of The Sharks), background vocals (Track 10)
 Ken Leroy – cast (Bernardo, leader of The Sharks), lead vocals (Track 10)
 George Marcy – cast (Pepe of The Sharks), background vocals (Track 10)
 Tony Mordente – cast (A-Rab of The Jets)
 David Winters – cast (Baby John of The Jets): lead vocals (Track 14), background vocals (Tracks 2, 8, 10)
 Jack Murray – cast (Moose of The Sharks), background vocals (Track 10)
 Jay Norman – cast (Juano of The Sharks), background vocals (Track 10)
 Julie Oser – cast (Pauline of The Jets), background vocals (Tracks 2, 8, 10, 14)
 Chita Rivera – cast (Anita), lead vocals (Tracks 7, 10, 15)
 Eddie Roll – cast (Action of The Jets), lead vocals (Track 14), background vocals (2, 8, 10, 14)
 Nanette Rosen – cast (Minnie of The Jets), background vocals (Tracks 2, 8, 10, 14)
 Jamie Sanchez – cast (Chino of The Sharks), background vocals (Track 10)
 Noel Schwartz – cast (Indio of The Sharks), background vocals (Track 10)

Production
Sylvia Drulie – associate producer
Gerald Freedman – assistant director
Peter Gennaro – choreographer
Max Goberman – director, musical director
Jon Eggert – arranger
Howard Jeffrey – assistant
Goddard Lieberson – producer
Harold Prince – arranger
Jean Rosenthal – lighting
Irene Sharaff – costume design
Wallace Siebert – assistant

Release history
Columbia LP: OS 2001 (stereo) also OL 5230 (mono)—issued 1957
Columbia LP: S 32603—issued 1973
Columbia CD: CK 32603—issued 1986
Columbia Broadway Masterworks CD: SK 60724—issued 1997
Hallmark CD: 709782—issued 2010

References 

Cast recordings
1957 soundtrack albums
Theatre soundtracks
Columbia Records soundtracks
Albums recorded at CBS 30th Street Studio
Albums produced by Goddard Lieberson
Albums conducted by Leonard Bernstein
United States National Recording Registry recordings
United States National Recording Registry albums